Prichard Colón Meléndez (born September 19, 1992) is an American-born Puerto Rican former professional boxer, honorary WBC World Champion, and gold medal winner at the 2010 Panamerican Youth Championship in the  category. After Prichard was disqualified in the 9th round of the Terrel Williams fight, he left to go to the dressing room where he collapsed and remained in a coma for 221 days due to a bleed on the brain. He was subjected to repeated blows to the back of his head during the fight. He is now awake and in a vegetative but stable condition which is steadily improving.

Early years and amateur career

Prichard Colón was born in Maitland, Florida. His parents are Richard and Nieves Colón, a retired waitress. At the age of 10, his father decided to move to Puerto Rico, so Prichard could represent the island in competitions. He moved there with his younger sister, while his mother and older brother remained in Florida. The family settled in the rural town of Orocovis, Puerto Rico.

Colón started his career at the Albergue Olímpico in Salinas, Puerto Rico. It was there that he earned the nickname of "Digget", which comes from the word "digger" in relation to his height. After graduating high school, Colón began studying Business Administration at the Universidad del Sagrado Corazón in San Juan, Puerto Rico.

During his amateur career, Colón gained fame for winning 5 national championships in both the 141 and 152 pound divisions. He also won the gold medal at the 2010 Pan American Youth Championship in the 64 kg category. He fought at the Brazil Pre-Olympics to win a pass to the 2012 Summer Olympics in London, but lost to a Venezuelan fighter in the third round.

In 2012, Colón decided to become a professional fighter. He ended his amateur career with a record of 17-0–0.

Professional career

Colón made his professional debut on February 23, 2013. His first fight was against Xavier La Salle at the Cosme Beitía Salamo Coliseum in Cataño, Puerto Rico. Colón knocked out LaSalle in the first round. Colón distinguished himself for his restless schedule. He fought five times in 2013 and 7 times in 2014. His most notable fight came on September 9, 2015 when he fought against Vivian Harris, a more experienced fighter. The fight was held at the Ricoh Coliseum in Toronto and ended with Colón knocking out Harris in the fourth round.

On October 17, 2015, Colón was slated to fight Terrel Williams in an undercard fight at the EagleBank Arena in Fairfax, Virginia. The fight was not originally part of the schedule, but was added when Andre Dirrell stepped out from his fight with Blake Caparello for medical reasons. The fight occurred just one month after Colón's last fight against Vivian Harris.

Brain injury 
Colón and Williams fought for nine rounds, in the first five rounds of which Colón appeared to be ahead. Throughout the match, Williams repeatedly punched Colón in the back of the head illegally. Colón informed the referee, Joe Cooper, of the illegal punches to the back of his head, to which the referee replied "You take care of it." Colón hit Williams with a low blow, for which Colón was penalized 2 points. After multiple illegal blows, Colón was knocked down for the first time in his professional career during the ninth round. Colón spoke to the ringside doctor between the rounds and stated he felt dizzy, but felt he could go on. The ringside doctor, Richard Ashby, cleared Colón and allowed the fight to continue. Colón was disqualified after the ninth round, when his corner mistakenly removed his gloves thinking it was the end of the fight. Colón's corner claimed he was incoherent and experiencing dizziness. After the fight, Colón was vomiting and was taken to the hospital where he was diagnosed with brain bleeding. As a result, Colón went into a coma for 221 days.

Colón was treated for several weeks at Inova Fairfax Hospital in Virginia, but was eventually transferred to Shepherd Center in Atlanta, Georgia. Colón was moved from the hospital to his mother's home in Orlando, Florida. As of April 2017, Colón had remained in a persistent vegetative state.

In 2017, the parents of Prichard Colón filed a lawsuit seeking damages from the ringside doctor and the promoters for more than $50 million. The lawsuit had not yet been settled as of 2019, and Prichard Colón's mother, Niéves Colón, believes it may never be settled.

In a September 2017 interview, while discussing his role in Colón’s injury, Williams said “I pray for Prichard every day. That’s never going to change. I wish him nothing but peace and health. No one wants what happened to Prichard to happen to anybody. All boxers are brothers.” Williams is now mostly known for his role in the fight, as opposed to his career.

In July 2018, Colón's mother posted a video of Colón on her Facebook account in which he can be seen taking physical therapy and responding to verbal commands. She also stated that he was learning how to communicate through a computer. She continues to upload videos of Colón's progress on YouTube.

Professional boxing record

References

External links

 How one fight changed Prichard Colon's life Outside the Lines tells the story of up and coming boxing prospect Prichard Colon, who after a bout in 2015 was left in a persistent vegetative state

Light-middleweight boxers
1992 births
Living people
American male boxers
American people of Puerto Rican descent
People from Maitland, Florida
People with disorders of consciousness
People with severe brain damage